The Industry Commission was a commission formed by the Australian government in 1990 to oversee industry matters. In 1998 with the passing of the Productivity Commission Act 1998 the bureau was merged with the Bureau of Industry Economics, and the Economic Planning Advisory Commission to create the Productivity Commission.

References 

Industry in Australia
1990 establishments in Australia
Government agencies established in 1990
Productivity organizations
Defunct Commonwealth Government agencies of Australia
1998 disestablishments in Australia